is a Japanese professional footballer who plays as a goalkeeper for Ehime FC.

References

External links

1997 births
Living people
Japanese footballers
Association football goalkeepers
Sagan Tosu players
Yokohama FC players
Ehime FC players
J2 League players